Eamon Joseph McCrory is a London-based scientist and clinical psychologist. He is Professor of Developmental Neuroscience and Psychopathology at University College London, where he Co-Directs the Developmental Risk and Resilience Unit. He is a Programme Director and member of the Executive team at the Anna Freud National Centre for Children and Families, Director of UKRI’s programme on Adolescent Mental Health and Wellbeing, and Co-Director of the UK Trauma Council.

He is best known for his work investigating how changes in the brain during childhood can shed light on the link between adversity and mental health.

Education 
McCrory was born in Belfast where he attended De La Salle College.  He then gained a place at Queens' College, Cambridge earning a double first in the Natural Sciences Tripos in 1995. McCrory then moved to University College London to work with Uta Frith and Cathy J. Price obtaining his Ph.D. in cognitive neuroscience in 2002. Subsequently, he undertook clinical training at King’s College London, obtaining his Doctorate in Clinical Psychology in 2004.

Career 
After completing his Ph.D McCrory trained as a Clinical Psychologist and began therapeutic work within the NHS and NSPCC, focusing on children and adolescents with complex presentations who had experienced significant trauma. He joined University College London as a lecturer in 2006, where he established the MRes in Developmental Neuroscience and Psychopathology, in collaboration with Linda Mayes at the Child Study Centre, Yale University. He also created the Developmental Risk and Resilience Unit, a collaborative research team focusing on developmental disorders, with Essi Viding in 2008. He became professor of Developmental Neuroscience and Psychopathology at University College London in 2014.

In 2018 McCrory co-founded the UK Trauma Council, an initiative that brings together expertise from across all four nations to improve outcomes for children and young people.  In 2019, he was appointed to the Executive leadership team at the Anna Freud National Centre for Children and Families, a leading UK charity for child mental health.

In 2020 McCrory became Director of the UK Research and Innovation (UKRI) programme in Adolescent Mental Health and Wellbeing. In this capacity he is responsible for investing £35 million in research and wider initiatives to improve the lives of young people in the U.K. McCrory also serves on a number of advisory committees, including the Scientific Advisory Board of NSPCC and the Early Intervention Foundation. He is also a member of the Royal Foundation’s Expert Advisory Group on Early Years, and in this capacity hosted a visit by the Duchess of Cambridge to UCL in 2018.

Research 
McCrory is best known for his work on childhood adversity, maltreatment and the brain. He is interested in why mental health problems develop, and has investigated how childhood trauma can impact brain structure and function in ways that may lead to an increased risk of later psychiatric disorder.

He has argued that alterations in brain structure and function, associated with childhood maltreatment, may in part represent adaptation to early dangerous or unpredictable environments.

In his theory of Latent Vulnerability, developed with Essi Viding, he argues that while neurocognitive adaptations may confer benefits for the child in early adverse environments they can create increased vulnerability in the longer term, as the child becomes less well equipped to successfully negotiate more normative environments and developmental challenges. His research has documented altered functioning in an array of neurocognitive systems, including the threat, reward and autobiographical memory systems. McCrory’s call for a greater focus on preventative approaches to child mental health has in part been informed by his finding that altered brain functioning following trauma is observable even before mental health problems emerge.

He has recently argued for the importance of viewing the brain as a social organ, claiming that mental health vulnerability following childhood maltreatment can in part be understood as a socially mediated process.

Selected articles 
McCrory, E. J., De Brito, S. A., Sebastian, C. L., Mechelli, A., Bird, G., Kelly, P. A., Viding, E. (2011). Heightened neural reactivity to threat in child victims of family violence. Current Biology 21(23), R947-R948.
McCrory, E.J., Gerin, M.I. and Viding, E., 2017. Annual Research Review: Childhood maltreatment, latent vulnerability and the shift to preventative psychiatry–the contribution of functional brain imaging. Journal of Child Psychology and Psychiatry, 58(4), pp. 338–357.
McCrory, E.J., Puetz, V.B., Maguire, E.A., Mechelli, A., Palmer, A., Gerin, M.I., Kelly, P.A., Koutoufa, I. and Viding, E., 2017. Autobiographical memory: a candidate latent vulnerability mechanism for psychiatric disorder following childhood maltreatment. The British Journal of Psychiatry, 212(4) 216-222.

References 

Living people
Alumni of the University of Cambridge
Alumni of King's College London
Alumni of University College London
Year of birth missing (living people)
British psychologists